Aptera was a town of ancient Lycia, mentioned by Stephanus of Byzantium.

Its location has not been determined.

References

Populated places in ancient Lycia
Former populated places in Turkey
Lost ancient cities and towns